The 2022 UTSA Roadrunners football team represented the University of Texas at San Antonio as a member of Conference USA (C-USA) during the 2022 NCAA Division I FBS football season. They were led by head coach Jeff Traylor, who was coaching his third season with the team. The Roadrunners played their home games at the Alamodome in San Antonio.

During the previous season, on October 21, 2021, UTSA accepted an invitation to join the American Athletic Conference (The American) and will become a full member on July 1, 2023. The 2022 season is thus the program's last as a member of C-USA.  Prior to the 2022 season, Conference USA shrank to 11 schools, as previous members Marshall, Old Dominion, and Southern Miss all departed to join (and in Old Dominion's case, rejoin) the Sun Belt Conference as full members. Thus the conference disbanded the divisions and played in a single league table.

The Roadrunners began their season with a thrilling triple-overtime contest against No. 24 Houston, ultimately coming up two points short. Another overtime game followed, with UTSA defeating Army to earn their first win. The Roadrunners split their following two games, with a loss at No. 21 Texas and a victory over FCS Texas Southern at home. Their nonconference schedule complete, the Roadrunners began their C–USA slate with a road clash against Middle Tennessee, a fifteen point win. A three-point win against Western Kentucky and a twenty-point win at FIU followed, leading UTSA into their homecoming contest against the North Texas Mean Green. The Roadrunners were victorious by a margin of four points, earning them their sixth win and bowl eligibility as a result. Following a bye week, the Roadrunners began November with another overtime game—their third of the season—as they took down UAB in double overtime. Dominant wins over Louisiana Tech and C-USA regular-season title vs Rice followed, 
and UTSA closed out their regular season at home with a three-point victory over the UTEP Miners, after overcoming a 24-point deficit they faced in the game's second quarter. The Roadrunners finished the regular season on a nine-game win streak, dating to September 24, and won the Conference USA regular season championship and a bid to the conference title game the following week. There, they defeated North Texas in a rematch by three touchdowns, earning the program's second overall and consecutive conference championship. UTSA finished the season with a record of 11–2 and a perfect 8–0 mark in conference play, and were ranked No. 22 in both the AP Poll and Coaches Poll. They finished No. 25 in the College Football Playoff rankings. They lost to Troy in the 2022 Cure Bowl, 18–12.

Previous season
After a win against Memphis on September 25, UTSA became 4–0 for the first time since the 2012 season. Two weeks later, on October 9, the program became 6–0 for the first time in its history after defeating Western Kentucky. A week later, on the weekend of October 16, the program entered the national polls for the first time, reaching No. 24 in the AP poll and No. 25 in the Coaches poll. The Roadrunners remained undefeated for the first time in its history until their 23–45 loss in the final game of the regular season against North Texas Mean Green football team. A 34–31 victory over UAB clinched the Conference USA Western Division title, their first in program history. The win also confirmed that the Roadrunners would play in their first conference championship game in program history, which they won 49–41 over WKU on December 3.

Preseason conference player awards 
Preseason player awards were announced on July 26.

Offensive Player of the Year: Frank Harris ( Senior, quarterback)
Defensive Player of the Year: Rashad Wisdom (Senior, safety)

C-USA media day 
The Conference USA media day was held on July 27 at Globe Life Field in Arlington, Texas. The Roadrunners were predicted to finish first in the conference's preseason poll.

Schedule
UTSA and Conference USA announced the 2022 football schedule on March 30, 2022.

Game summaries

No. 24 Houston

at Army

at No. 20 Texas

Texas Southern

at Middle Tennessee

Western Kentucky

at FIU

North Texas

at UAB

Louisiana Tech

at Rice

UTEP

North Texas (C-USA Championship Game)

Troy (Cure Bowl)

Coaching staff

Rankings

References

UTSA
UTSA Roadrunners football seasons
Conference USA football champion seasons
UTSA Roadrunners football